Çalık is a Turkish surname. Notable people with the surname include:

 Ahmet Çalık (born 1958), Turkish businessman
 Ahmet Yılmaz Çalık (1994–2022), Turkish footballer
 Burak Çalık (born 1989), Turkish footballer
 Şadi Çalık (1917–1979), Turkish sculptor

See also
 Çalık, Keban

Turkish-language surnames